Christopher O'Rourke (born 13 March 1945) is a former English cricketer.  O'Rourke was a right-handed batsman who fielded as a wicket-keeper.  He was born at Widnes, Lancashire.

O'Rourke made a single first-class appearance for Warwickshire against Scotland at Edgbaston in 1968.  In this match, he ended Warwickshire's first-innings of 350 unbeaten on 23.  Scotland were dismissed for just 88 in their first-innings, with O'Rourke who was keeping wicket in the match taking a single catch in that innings.  Scotland were forced to follow-on and made 76/5, with O'Rourke taking a further two catches in that innings.  The match ended in a draw.  This was his only major appearance for Warwickshire.

References

External links
Christopher O'Rourke at ESPNcricinfo
Christopher O'Rourke at CricketArchive

1945 births
Living people
Sportspeople from Widnes
English cricketers
Warwickshire cricketers
Wicket-keepers